Niko Koprivica (1889 in Cavtat – 25 October 1944, in  Dubrovnik) was a politician of the Croatian Peasant Party who was mayor of Dubrovnik in the final days of the Independent State of Croatia. He was a lawyer by profession.

Koprivica was admitted to the Catholic Church's Order of St. Gregory the Great in 1926. He was a member of the Brethren of the Croatian Dragon and held the title of Dragon of Cavtat within the organization.

Koprivica was selected by the city council to be mayor on 13 October 1944. He was killed by Yugoslav Partisans as a collaborationist on 25 October 1944. He was interred on 10 October 2008 following a funeral mass at the Assumption Cathedral in Dubrovnik.

See also
 Daksa massacre

References

1889 births
1944 deaths
Croatian lawyers
Croatian civilians killed in World War II
Executed Yugoslav collaborators with Nazi Germany
Mayors of Dubrovnik
People from Konavle
Executed Croatian people
Yugoslav lawyers